Tehuelche was an Argentine motorcycle that was produced between March 1957 and 1964.

The Tehuelche was the only Argentine motorcycle that was mass-produced continuously in Argentina for seven years.

The Tehuelche competed with the Puma Primera and Puma Segunda (from Guericke), the Zanella (from Ceccato), and the Gilera,. The Tehuelche distinguished itself not only by the characteristic sound of the gear train (SOHC engine), but also for its performance in its racing career.

Design

The creators of the Tehuelche were Juan Raffaldi and Roberto Fattorini.  The two men moved to Argentina from Italy in 1949, specifically for this project. Raffaldi and Fattorini brought machinery and capital for the Tehuelche.

In 1955, the two men created a design for the Telhuelche.  Raffaldi then created a four-stroke engine of 50 cc displacement (single overhead camshaft- SOHC). This design was a little unusual for its time, because until then, it had been used primarily in racing motorcycles; further, it had no oil pump and it was made totally out of aluminum.

Manufacture
With a few partners, Raffaldi and Fattorini started mass-producing the Telhuelche. For this purpose, they raised the engine capacity to 75 cc, with the purpose of entering a new market category. This first partnership barely lasted two years during which just over 1,200 motorcycles were produced.

Raffaldi and Fattorini started a new partnership with new members, continuing production until the middle of 1964 by manufacturing approximately 3,500 motorcycles

The total number of Tehuelches ever produced to almost 5,000.

The models
In the almost seven years of manufacture, some of the colors and the decals of the Tehuelche were changed.

In 1962, two models were produced: the Sport and the Super Sport, the latter bearing a speedometer. In addition, since the second partnership had the rights to import the Legnano motorcycle from Italy, a model of the Tehuelche was introduced that was called “Legnano”, hoping to increase sales.

This model appeared on the market with a different gas tank and painted red and white. Finally, in 1964, toward the end of production, the camshaft that had been driven by gears was changed to a chain drive camshaft.

End of production
In 1964,  Raffaldi and Fattorini decided to abandon the Tehuelche.  Hyperinflation and government instability in Argentina made it difficult for them to continue.

Technical characteristics

 Engine: Four-stroke
 Cooling: Air
 Bore: 48 mm
 Stroke: 41 mm
 Capacity: 75 cc
 Compression ratio: 6.5:1
 Power: 4.74 hp
 RPM at maximum power: 6500
 Approximate consumption: 1 liter of gasoline per 50 km
 Distribution: Single overhead camshaft (SOHC)
 Valves: Two valves arranged in a 90° configuration, operated through rocker arms.
 Lubrication: Wet sump, splash lubrication. A hook, attached onto the connecting rod, dips into the oil in the sump and splashes it around the inside of the engine.
 Oil capacity: ½ liter
 Clutch: Mono-disc in oil bath
 Gearbox: Three-speed
 Gear ratios:
1st gear        2.628
2nd gear        1.542
3rd gear        1
 Speed relations:
1st speed: 28 km/h
2nd speed: 48 km/h
3rd speed: 74 km/h
 Carburetion: Dellorto MA16 carburetor, made under license in Argentina.
 Diffuser diameter: 16 mm
High Speed Jet: #70
Idle Jet:  #30
 Sprayer: 260
 Frame: Chassis made out of welded steel tubes
 Wheels: Steel rims, 18 inches x 1⅜
 Tires (front and rear): 18 inches x 2¼
 •	Tire pressure:
 Front: 22 lbf/in² (150 kPa)
 Rear: 28 lbf/in² (190 kPa)
 Weight: 96 kg

References

External links 

 Official Website Tehuelche the Motorcycle
 Book Tehuelche the Motorcycle ISBN 978-987-88-0341-8

Motorcycles by brand
Motorcycles of Argentina